Bruno Kneubühler (born 3 December 1946) is a Swiss former professional Grand Prix motorcycle road racer.

During his career, he competed in every Grand Prix class from 50 cc to 500cc. In his first Grand Prix season in 1972, Kneubühler finished the 500cc season in third place behind the dominant MV Agusta factory racing team of Giacomo Agostini and Alberto Pagani. He also won the season-ending 350cc Spanish Grand Prix held on the Montjuich street circuit, finishing ahead of Renzo Pasolini and János Drapál. A year later, he showed his versatility at the 1973 Spanish Grand Prix by scoring second-place finishes in the 50cc, 250cc and 500cc classes. At the 1974 250cc Dutch TT, he scored a second-place finish ahead of third-place finisher and future three-time world champion Kenny Roberts in the American rider's first Grand Prix race. He had his best year in 1983 when he won two Grand Prix races and finished second to Angel Nieto in the 125cc class.

While he never won a championship, he finished in second place three times, winning 5 Grand Prix races and scoring 33 podium results. He retired in 1989 at the age of 43. His lengthy Grand Prix career saw him compete against many champions from Giacomo Agostini to Mick Doohan. Kneubühler is now back in Classic racing with a Yamaha TZ 350 participating in the International Classic Grand Prix series in races such as 24 Hours of Le Mans.

Motorcycle Grand Prix results
Points system from 1969 to 1987:

Points system from 1988 to 1991:

(key) (Races in bold indicate pole position; races in italics indicate fastest lap)

References

1946 births
Living people
Swiss motorcycle racers
50cc World Championship riders
125cc World Championship riders
250cc World Championship riders
350cc World Championship riders
500cc World Championship riders
Place of birth missing (living people)